Næringslivsavisen NA24.no AS or NA24 is a Norwegian online business newspaper. It was created on 22 March 2006 as a merger between the business sections of Nettavisen, Fædrelandsvennen, Stavanger Aftenblad, Bergens Tidende and Adresseavisen, and the online newspapers iMarkedet and Propaganda. It has 400,000 weekly users, and editor-in-chief is Inge Berge. It is owned 40% by the TV2 Group, 20% by Aller Internett and 10% by each the four participating regional newspapers.

References

External links
 Official website

Newspapers published in Norway
Norwegian-language newspapers
Business newspapers
European news websites
2006 establishments in Norway
Publications established in 2006